Andreas Thom is a German mathematician, working on geometric group theory, algebraic topology, ergodic theory of group actions, and operator algebras.

Education and career

Thom received in 2000 his Certificate of Advanced Study in Mathematics from the University of Cambridge. In 2003 he obtained his doctorate (Promotion) from the University of Münster with thesis advisor Joachim Cuntz and thesis Connective E-Theory and Bivariant Homology for C*-Algebra. He was a Postdoc 2003–2005 at the University of Münster, and 2005–2007 at the University of Göttingen. From 2007 to 2009 he was a junior professor for Geometrical Aspects of Pure Mathematics at the University of Göttingen. After being promoted to assistant professor in Göttingen, he moved in 2009 to become a full professor for Theoretical Mathematics at the University of Leipzig. In 2014 he moved for a full professorship in Geometry to the TU Dresden.

Awards and honors

 In 2011, Thom received an ERC Starting Grant No. 277728 Geometry and Analysis of Group Rings.
 In 2016, he received an ERC Consolidator Grant No. 681207 Groups, Dynamics, and Approximation.
 In 2018, Thom was an invited speaker for a talk Finitary approximations of groups and their applications at the International Congress of Mathematicians in Rio de Janeiro.

Selected publications

References

External links
 Andreas Thom on the website of the TU Dresden
 arxiv.org preprints by Andreas Thom

20th-century German mathematicians
21st-century German mathematicians
Academic staff of TU Dresden
Living people
Year of birth missing (living people)